Sermaise may refer to:
 Sermaise, Maine-et-Loire, a commune of the Pays de la Loire region of France
 Sermaise, Essonne, a commune of the Île-de-France region